

1980

Medals

1981

Medals

1982

Non-circulating coins

Medals

1983

Non-circulating coins

Medals

1984

Non-circulating coins

Medals

1986

Non-circulating coins

1987

Non-circulating coins

1988

Non-circulating coins

1989

Non-circulating coins

References 

Commemorative coins of the United States